Kountry Meadows, also known as Kountry Meadow Estates, is an unincorporated community in Alberta, Canada within Red Deer County that is recognized as a designated place by Statistics Canada. It is adjacent to the Hamlet of Benalto to the south.

Demographics 

See also 
List of communities in Alberta
List of designated places in Alberta

References 

Designated places in Alberta
Localities in Red Deer County